The Bakersfield City Council is the main governing body for Bakersfield, California. Under the council-manager form of government, the city council is the most powerful branch of government. It has seven members who represent seven wards. The city council meetings are presided over by the elected mayor.

Powers and duties
The powers and duties are listed in Article III of the Bakersfield City Charter. Their primary function is the passing of ordinances for: raising revenue, appropriating money from the treasury, and regulations for the city. The specific duties, which ordinances passed to fulfill, are listed in Article III, section 12. There are too many to list here, but generally include all powers a city would need to provide proper services and maintain order for its citizens.

Ordinances are voted on by the city council and a majority vote is needed to pass it. However, approval by the mayor or other official is not needed for the measure to become active. As a result, any measure with enough votes will become active 30 days after the vote, unless the council votes to repeal it.

Council members are elected to four year terms. Elections are staggered every two years. As a result, only half of the members are up for reelection during one election cycle.

Representative Districts (Wards)
City council members are elected from one of seven wards. Each ward is drawn to represent an equal number of citizens. They are redrawn from time to time (typically after the United States Census) to update changes in population and boundaries. Wards are drawn to represent different regions of Bakersfield; however, the boundaries are not exact. This is primarily for two reasons. Bakersfield’s regions have sections that are not a part of the city, and do not have representation. Also, each region is not of equal size. For example, the southwest, which is densely populated, requires two wards. The northeast, which is sparsely populated, shares its ward with part of the northwest.

Committees
The city council has several committees. Each committee examines potential ordinances and issues related to specific topics. Each is made up of three council members, one of which is the chairman.

The committees are:

Budget & Finance
Community Services
Legislative & Litigation
Personnel

Planning & Development
Safe Neighborhoods
Water Resources

References

External links
 Mayor & City Council Homepage

c
California city councils